The Legions of Marshal Józef Piłsudski Bridge is a road-railway bridge over the Vistula River in Płock, Poland, connecting the Old Town and Radziwie district on a left river bank.

The Legions of Marshal Józef Piłsudski Bridge in Płock is the longest illuminated bridge in Europe.

Road-rail bridges
Railway bridges in Poland
Bridges completed in 1938
Bridges in Płock
Road bridges in Poland